is a Japanese badminton player from Renesas badminton club. Reika Kakiiwa has gained prominence in the badminton community because of her success in women's doubles. She has reached a career high ranking of third in the world with her partner Mizuki Fujii. She has also competed in mixed doubles reaching a peak ranking of 51st with her partner Kenta Kazuno.

Awards 
In 2012, she and her partner Mizuki Fujii received the Kumamoto Prefecture Citizen Honour's Award. She also received the Sports Special Award by Otsu City.

Achievements

Olympic Games 
Women's doubles

BWF World Championships 
Women's doubles

BWF Superseries 
The BWF Superseries has two level such as Superseries and Superseries Premier. A season of Superseries features twelve tournaments around the world, which introduced since 2011, with successful players invited to the Superseries Finals held at the year end.

Women's doubles

  BWF Superseries Finals tournament
  BWF Superseries Premier tournament
  BWF Superseries tournament

BWF Grand Prix 
The BWF Grand Prix has two levels: Grand Prix Gold and Grand Prix. It is a series of badminton tournaments, sanctioned by Badminton World Federation (BWF) since 2007.

Women's doubles

  BWF Grand Prix Gold tournament
  BWF Grand Prix tournament

BWF International Challenge/Series 
Women's doubles

  BWF International Challenge tournament
  BWF International Series tournament

Record against selected opponents 
Women's doubles results with Mizuki Fujii against Super Series finalists, Worlds Semi-finalists, and Olympic quarterfinalists.

  Leanne Choo & Renuga Veeran 2–0
 / Petya Nedelcheva & Anastasia Russkikh 1–0
  Alex Bruce & Michelle Li 1–0
  Du Jing & Yu Yang 0–1
  Xia Huan & Tang Jinhua 1–2
  Cheng Shu & Zhao Yunlei 0–4
  Wang Xiaoli & Yu Yang 0–4
  Bao Yixin & Zhong Qianxin 0–4
  Tian Qing & Zhao Yunlei 1–3
  Cheng Wen-hsing & Chien Yu-chin 2–4
  Christinna Pedersen & Kamilla Rytter Juhl 2–3
  Poon Lok Yan & Tse Ying Suet 4–0
  Jwala Gutta & Ashwini Ponnappa 3–1
  Vita Marissa & Nadya Melati 1–2
  Miyuki Maeda & Satoko Suetsuna 0–2
  Shizuka Matsuo & Mami Naito 4–3
  Ha Jung-eun & Kim Min-jung 3–3
  Jung Kyung-eun & Kim Ha-na 1–3
  Chin Eei Hui & Wong Pei Tty 4–2
  Valeria Sorokina & Nina Vislova 4–2
  Jiang Yanmei & Li Yujia 0–1
  Shinta Mulia Sari & Yao Lei 3–1
  Duanganong Aroonkesorn & Kunchala Voravichitchaikul 2–1

References

External links 

 
 

1989 births
Living people
Sportspeople from Kumamoto Prefecture
Japanese female badminton players
Badminton players at the 2012 Summer Olympics
Olympic badminton players of Japan
Olympic silver medalists for Japan
Olympic medalists in badminton
Medalists at the 2012 Summer Olympics
Badminton players at the 2010 Asian Games
Badminton players at the 2014 Asian Games
Asian Games bronze medalists for Japan
Asian Games medalists in badminton
Medalists at the 2014 Asian Games
21st-century Japanese women